Pierre Nicolas Le Chéron d'Incarville (21 August 1706 – 12 June 1757) was a French Jesuit and amateur botanist. He was a missionary to China and was the first person to introduce several important plants to the West. During his stay, he was also actively involved in publishing scholarly material on China.

Life
D'Incarville was born in Louviers (although some sources cite Rouen). He entered the Jesuit order in 1727 and taught in Quebec between 1730 and 1739 before being sent on a mission to China in 1740. He was tasked with converting the Qianlong Emperor of China, but the emperor showed little interest and denied d'Incarville access to the imperial gardens. However, when the emperor was shown some sensitive plants (Mimosa pudica) that d'Incarville had grown, he was so amused that he allowed the Jesuit into the gardens. D'Incarville was on excellent terms with the emperor and he continued to introduce many other European plants to him during his time in China.

D'Incarville described and sent back seeds of several plants then unknown in Europe as a correspondent of the Jardin des Plantes. He was not a professional botanist, but was nonetheless well educated in the field and was made a correspondent of Claude Joseph Geoffroy at the Académie des Sciences in Paris after refusing to become a foreign associate of the Royal Society. Plants he introduced to the Western world include the tree of heaven (Ailanthus altissima), the pagoda tree (Styphnolobium japonicum), Koelreuteria paniculata and Toona sinensis. He was also the first European to describe the kiwifruit.

In addition to his correspondence work, he wrote several works that were published in Europe. These covered topics such as the ailanthus silkmoth, Chinese varnishing and fireworks, as well as a French-Chinese dictionary. He also published a copy of a 16th-century botanical illustration work (the Yuzhi bencao pinhui jingyao). D'Incarville died in Beijing in June 1757. Antoine-Laurent de Jussieu named the bignoniaceae genus Incarvillea after him.

References

1706 births
1757 deaths
French Roman Catholic missionaries
Roman Catholic missionaries in China
People from Louviers
18th-century French botanists
18th-century French Jesuits
Missionary botanists